is a Japanese multinational holding company, production enterprise and entertainment conglomerate providing film production and distribution. It has its headquarters in Chiyoda, Tokyo, and is one of the core companies of the Osaka-based Hankyu Hanshin Toho Group. Outside of Japan, it is best known as the producer and distributor of many kaiju and tokusatsu films; the Chouseishin tokusatsu superhero television franchise; the films of Akira Kurosawa; and the anime films of Studio Ghibli, CoMix Wave Films, TMS Entertainment, and OLM, Inc. Most of the highest-grossing Japanese films are released by Toho. Other famous directors, including Yasujirō Ozu, Kenji Mizoguchi, Masaki Kobayashi, and Mikio Naruse, also directed films for Toho.

Toho's most famous creation is Godzilla, who is featured in 32 of the company's films. Godzilla, Rodan, Mothra, King Ghidorah and Mechagodzilla are described as Toho's Big Five because of the monsters' numerous appearances throughout the franchise, as well as spin-offs. Toho has also been involved in the production of numerous anime titles. Its subdivisions are Toho-Towa Company, Limited (Japanese exclusive theatrical distributor of Universal Pictures via NBCUniversal Entertainment Japan), Towa Pictures Company Limited (Japanese exclusive theatrical distributor of Paramount Pictures), Toho Pictures Incorporated, Toho International Company Limited, Toho E. B. Company Limited, and Toho Music Corporation & Toho Costume Company Limited. The company is the largest shareholder (7.96%) of Fuji Media Holdings Inc.

Toho is one of the four members of the Motion Picture Producers Association of Japan (MPPAJ), is the largest of Japan's Big Four film studios, and is the only film studio that is a component of the Nikkei 225 index.

History

It managed much of the kabuki in Tokyo and, among other properties, the eponymous Tokyo Takarazuka Theatre and the Imperial Garden Theater in Tokyo; 

In 1953, Toho established Toho International, a Los Angeles-based subsidiary intended to target North American and Latin American markets. Seven Samurai was among the first films offered for foreign sales.

Toho and Shochiku competed with the influx of Hollywood films and boosted the film industry by focusing on new directors of the likes of Akira Kurosawa, Kon Ichikawa, Keisuke Kinoshita, Ishirō Honda, and Kaneto Shindo.

After several successful film exports to the United States during the 1950s through Henry G. Saperstein, Toho took over the La Brea Theatre in Los Angeles to show its films without the need to sell them to a distributor. It was known as the Toho Theatre from the late 1960s until the 1970s. Toho also had a theater in San Francisco and opened a theater in New York City in 1963. The Shintoho Company, which existed until 1961, was named New Toho because it broke off from the original company. Toho has contributed to the production of some American films, including Sam Raimi's 1998 film, A Simple Plan and Paul W. S. Anderson's 2020 military science fiction/kaiju film, Monster Hunter.

In 2019, Toho invested ¥15.4 billion ($14 million) into their Los Angeles-based subsidiary Toho International Inc. as part of their "Toho Vision 2021 Medium-term Management Strategy", a strategy to increase content, platform, real-estate, beat JPY50 billion profits, and increase character businesses on Toho intellectual properties such as Godzilla. Hiroyasu Matsuoka was named the representative director of the US subsidiary.

In 2020, Toho acquired a 34.8% stake in the animation studio TIA, with ILCA and Anima each retaining a 32.6% stake. In 2022, Toho acquired Anima's 32.6% stake to take a controlling 67.4% stake in TIA, making the studio a subsidiary, and ultimately renaming the studio into Toho Animation Studios.

Major productions and distributions

Films

1930s

1940s

1950s

1960s

1970s

1980s

1990s

2000s

2010s

2020s

Upcoming films

Television

Tokusatsu
Ike! Godman (1972)
Warrior of Love: Rainbowman (1972)
Zone Fighter (1973)
Ike! Greenman (1973)
Warrior Of Light: Diamond Eye (1973)
Flying Saucer War Bankid (1976)
Megaloman (1979)
Electronic Brain Police Cybercop (1988)
Seven Stars Fighting God Guyferd (1996)
Stickin' Around (1996-1998)
Godzilla Island (1997)
Chouseishin Gransazer (2003)
Genseishin Justirisers (2004)
Chousei Kantai Sazer-X (2005)
Kawaii! Jenny (2007)
Godziban (2019–present)

Anime
Belle and Sebastian (1981)
Igano Kabamaru (1983)
Touch (1985)
Kimagure Orange Road (1987)
Baoh (1989)
Godzilland (1992)
Shimajiro (1993–present)
Midori Days (co-production) (2004)

Toho Animation
Toho Animation is a Japanese anime production founded in 2012, and owned by Toho Co., Ltd., which is one of the top three film distributors in Japan.

Psycho-Pass (2012)
Majestic Prince (2013)
Galactic Armored Fleet Majestic Prince: Wings to the Future (2016)
Galactic Armored Fleet Majestic Prince: Genetic Awakening (2016)
Fantasista Doll (2013)
Meganebu! (2013)
Yowamushi Pedal (2013)
Engaged to the Unidentified (2014)
One Week Friends (2014)
Haikyū!! (2014)
Ao Haru Ride (2014)
Blood Blockade Battlefront (2015)
Chaos Dragon (2015)
Monster Musume (2015)
Himouto! Umaru-chan (2015)
Himouto! Umaru-chan R (2017)
Grimgar of Fantasy and Ash (2016)
She and Her Cat: Everything Flows (2016)
My Hero Academia (2016)
Three Leaves, Three Colors (2016)
Orange (2016)
Touken Ranbu: Hanamaru (2016)
Zoku Touken Ranbu: Hanamaru (2018)
Toku Touken Ranbu: Hanamaru ~Setsugetsuka~ (2022)
Little Witch Academia (2017)
Sakura Quest (2017)
Land of the Lustrous (2017)
Teasing Master Takagi-san (2018)
Uma Musume Pretty Derby (2018)
Hanebado! (2018)
Run with the Wind (2018)
Anima Yell! (2018)
FLCL Progressive (2018)
FLCL Alternative (2018)
Fairy Gone (2019)
Dr. Stone (2019)
Business Fish (2019)
Beastars (2019)
Azur Lane (2019)
Drifting Dragons (2020)
BNA: Brand New Animal (2020)
Great Pretender (2020)
Dorohedoro (2020)
Jujutsu Kaisen (2020)
Mushoku Tensei (2021)
Seven Knights (2021)
Godzilla Singular Point (2021)
Spy × Family (2022)
The Angel Next Door Spoils Me Rotten (2023)
Kaiju No. 8 (2024)

Video games
 Cliff Hanger

In more recent years and for a period, they have produced video games. One of their first video games was the 1990 NES game titled Circus Caper. Later, they followed with a series of games based on Godzilla and a 1992 game called Serizawa Nobuo no Birdy Try. It also published games such as Super Aleste (Space Megaforce in North America). They even worked with Bandai on Dr. Jekyll and Mr. Hyde, released in Japan in 1988 and in the United States in 1989.

Toho Cinderella Audition
The Toho Cinderella Audition is an audition to discover new young actresses, first held in 1984 and irregularly held since then. It is considered one of Japan's "Big Three Actress Auditions", along with Oscar Promotion's National Bishōjo Contest and Horipro's Talent Scout Caravan.

Headquarters
The company moved into its current headquarters in April 2005.

See also

TohoScope
Shintoho
Tsuburaya Productions
Daiei Film
Kadokawa Daiei Studio
Nikkatsu
Shochiku
Toei Company
Toei Animation
Studio Ghibli
Studio Ponoc
OLM, Inc.
Studio Chizu
Sunrise
Level-5
TMS Entertainment, Ltd.
Benesse
Shin-Ei Animation

References

Sources

External links

  
 Official Toho YouTube channel.
 Toho Pictures official website
 TOHO-TOWA Company, Limited official website
 TOWA PICTURES Company, Ltd. official website
Toho Company on IMDb
 

 
1932 establishments in Japan
Anime companies
Companies listed on the Tokyo Stock Exchange
Conglomerate companies based in Tokyo
Conglomerate companies established in 1932
Conglomerate companies of Japan
Distribution companies based in Tokyo
Entertainment companies established in 1975
Film distributors of Japan
Holding companies based in Tokyo
Holding companies established in 1932
Hankyu Hanshin Holdings
Japanese brands
Japanese film studios
Keiretsu
Mass media companies based in Tokyo
Mass media companies established in 1932
Mass media companies of Japan
Midori-kai
Multinational companies headquartered in Japan
Video game companies of Japan
Video game development companies
Video game publishers